Jorge Baldemar Utrilla Robles (born 21 April 1961) is a Mexican politician affiliated with the Institutional Revolutionary Party. He served as Deputy of the LIX Legislature of the Mexican Congress representing Chiapas. He previously served as municipal president of Yajalón from 1980 to 1982 and from 1992 to 1995.

References

1961 births
Living people
Politicians from Chiapas
Institutional Revolutionary Party politicians
Municipal presidents in Chiapas
20th-century Mexican politicians
21st-century Mexican politicians
Deputies of the LIX Legislature of Mexico
Members of the Chamber of Deputies (Mexico) for Chiapas